Euphrasia cambrica, commonly called the Welsh eyebright, is a plant from the genus Euphrasia, in the family Orobanchaceae. It is endemic to North Wales where it occurs on mountains in the vice-counties of Caernarfonshire and Merionethshire.

References

cambrica